The 2018 Rhode Island gubernatorial election was held on November 6, 2018, to elect the Governor of Rhode Island, concurrently with the election of Rhode Island's Class I U.S. Senate seat, as well as other elections to the United States Senate in other states, elections to the United States House of Representatives, and various state and local elections.

On September 12, 2018, incumbent governor Gina Raimondo and Cranston mayor and 2014 gubernatorial nominee Allan Fung won the Democratic and Republican primaries respectively, facing each other in a rematch of the 2014 election. Raimondo defeated Fung in the general election on November 6 to win a second term as governor, improving on her plurality win in 2014 to earn a majority of the votes, and becoming the first gubernatorial candidate (incumbent or challenger) to win a majority of votes since Donald Carcieri in 2006. It was also the first time that a Democrat was re-elected as Governor of Rhode Island since Bruce Sundlun won a second term in 1992, and the first time ever they did so for four year terms.

Democratic primary

Candidates

Nominated
 Gina Raimondo, incumbent governor

Eliminated in primary
 Matt Brown, former Secretary of State of Rhode Island and candidate for U.S. Senate in 2006
 Spencer Dickinson, former state representative

Withdrawn
 Paul Roselli, president of the Burrillville Land Trust (running for State Senate Dist. 23) (Endorsed Matt Brown)

Declined
 Lincoln Chafee, former governor and candidate for President of the United States in 2016
 James Langevin, U.S. Representative
 Angel Taveras, former Mayor of Providence and candidate for governor in 2014
 Daniel McKee, lieutenant governor (running for reelection)

Endorsements

Results

Republican primary

Candidates

Nominated
 Allan Fung, Mayor of Cranston and nominee for governor in 2014

Eliminated in primary
 Giovanni Feroce, businessman, former state senator and nominee for lieutenant governor in 1994
 Patricia Morgan, Minority Leader of the Rhode Island House of Representatives

Declined
 Robert Flanders, former associate justice of the Rhode Island Supreme Court (running for U.S. Senate)
 Robert Nardolillo, state representative (running for U.S. Senate)
 Joe Trillo, former state representative (running as an independent)
 John Hazen White, businessman

Endorsements

Polling

Results

Moderate primary

Candidates

Declared
 Bill Gilbert, chairman of the Moderate Party of Rhode Island and nominee for lieutenant governor in 2014

Independents

Declared
 Luis Daniel Muñoz, physician and community organizer
 Joe Trillo, former Republican state representative

Failed to qualify
 Rebecca McLaughlin

Declined
 Matt Brown, former Secretary of State of Rhode Island (running as a Democrat)

Minor third parties

Declared
Anne Armstrong (Compassion Party), cannabis activist

General election

Debates
Complete video of debate, September 27, 2018
Complete video of debate, October 15, 2018

Predictions

Polling

with Gina Raimondo and Patricia Morgan

with Gina Raimondo and Giovanni Feroce

with Matt Brown and Allan Fung

with Matt Brown and Patricia Morgan

with Matt Brown and Giovanni Feroce

Results

See also
Rhode Island elections, 2018

References

External links
Candidates at Vote Smart
Candidates at Ballotpedia

Official campaign websites
Allan Fung (R) for Governor
Bill Gilbert (M) for Governor
Luis-Daniel Muñoz (I) for Governor
Gina Raimondo (D) for Governor
Joe Trillo (I) for Governor

2018 Rhode Island elections
2018
2018 United States gubernatorial elections